On April 11, 2021, Daunte Wright, a 20-year-old black man, was fatally shot by police officer Kimberly Potter during a traffic stop and attempted arrest for an outstanding warrant in Brooklyn Center, Minnesota, United States. After a brief struggle with officers, Potter shot Wright in the chest once at close range. Wright then drove off a short distance, but his vehicle collided with another and hit a concrete barrier. Officers administered CPR, but were unable to revive him, and he was pronounced dead at the scene. Potter said she meant to use her service Taser, shouting "Taser! Taser! Taser!" just before firing her service pistol instead.

The shooting sparked protests in Brooklyn Center and renewed ongoing demonstrations against police shootings in the Minneapolis–Saint Paul metropolitan area, leading to citywide and regional curfews. Demonstrations took place over several days, and spread to cities across the United States. Two days after the incident, Potter and Brooklyn Center police chief Tim Gannon resigned from their positions.

Potter was convicted of first-degree manslaughter and second-degree manslaughter on December 23, 2021, at a jury trial in Hennepin County. On February 18, 2022, she was sentenced to sixteen months in prison, with credit for time served. Wright's family settled a wrongful death lawsuit with the City of Brooklyn Center on June 21, 2022, for $3.25 million. The events led to several changes in Taser policies, in Brooklyn Center and elsewhere in the United States.

People involved

Daunte Wright 
Daunte Demetrius Wright was a 20-year-old living in Minneapolis, having recently moved there from Chicago. He was the son of a black father and a white mother. Wright played basketball in high school, but according to his father, he dropped out due to a learning disability about two years before the shooting. He worked in retail and fast-food jobs to support his almost-two-year-old son, and had enrolled in a vocational school.

Kimberly Potter 
At the time of the shooting, Kimberly Ann Potter, a White woman from Champlin, Minnesota (born June 18, 1972), was a 48-year-old police officer in the Brooklyn Center Police Department, and a mother of two sons. She had worked for the department since 1995, shortly after finishing Saint Mary's University of Minnesota a year prior in 1994. Potter, a field training officer, was training a new officer at the time of the incident.

Others 
Alayna Albrecht-Payton, a 20-year-old resident of Saint Paul, Minnesota, and Wright's girlfriend, was sitting in the passenger's seat of the vehicle and was injured in the crash. Two other Brooklyn Center police officers were involved in the traffic stop. One of them was a trainee working with Potter who also participated in the attempted arrest.

Incident

Traffic stop
On April 11, 2021, Wright was driving with his girlfriend in a white 2011 Buick LaCrosse that was registered to his brother. They were on their way to a car wash. Kimberly Potter was a passenger in a patrol car with a trainee officer who observed Wright's vehicle signaling a right turn while it was in a left-turning lane. The trainee officer also noticed that the vehicle had an expired registration tag on its license plate and had an air freshener hanging from the car's rearview mirror, a violation of Minnesota state law. At 1:53p.m. local time, the trainee officer initiated a traffic stop of Wright's vehicle on 63rd Avenue North and called for backup.

After pulling the vehicle over, the trainee officer approached Wright's vehicle. Wright provided his name but did not have a driver's license or proof-of-insurance card. The trainee officer returned to his squad car. Meanwhile, Wright phoned his mother. Potter's supervisor arrived on the scene, and the officers ran Wright's name through a police database. They learned he had an open arrest warrant for failing to appear in court on a gross misdemeanor weapons violation for carrying a gun without a permit, and that there was a protective order against him by an unnamed woman. The officers decided to arrest Wright and ensure the passenger was not the same woman who had the protective order against him.

Police body camera footage showed Potter, her supervisor, and the trainee officer approaching the car. The trainee officer approached the driver's side door and the supervisor approached the passenger's side door. Potter, who was acting as a field training officer, initially stood back. The trainee officer informed Wright that there was a warrant for his arrest. He opened the driver's side door and Wright stepped out of the car. The car door remained open while Wright put his hands behind his back and the trainee officer attempted to put on handcuffs.

After several moments, Potter approached Wright and the trainee and unsnapped her handgun holster. She grabbed a piece of paper from the trainee with her right hand, then moved it to her left hand. Wright, who was unarmed, began to resist arrest, struggled with the officers, broke free, and stepped back into his car. The supervisor had the passenger's side door open, and reached inside to grab the gear shift to prevent Wright from driving away. The trainee officer on the driver's side attempted to prevent Wright from obtaining control of the steering wheel. Potter, who had her Taser holstered on her left side and her gun on her right, said, "I'll tase you," and then yelled, "Taser! Taser! Taser!" The supervisor released his hands from attempting to restrain Wright. Potter then discharged her firearm, instead of her Taser, a single time using her right hand, and subsequently said, "Oh shit, I just shot him."

Potter's pistol, a Glock 9 mm model, was entirely black, partially made of metal, and weighed  when loaded. Potter was holding her gun for 5.5 seconds before discharging it. Immediately after shooting Wright, she was still holding the piece of paper with her left hand.

Car crash 
Wright drove off after being shot at close range. The vehicle traveled for about  when it collided with another vehicle near the intersection of 63rd Avenue North and Kathrene Drive. Officers administered cardiopulmonary resuscitation (CPR), but Wright was pronounced dead at the scene at 2:18 p.m. Albrecht-Payton, the passenger in Wright's vehicle, was hospitalized with non-life-threatening injuries, and no one in the other vehicle was injured.

Investigations and criminal charges

Autopsy 
The Hennepin County medical examiner's office released a report on April 12 that determined the manner of death to be homicide and concluded that Wright had "died of a gunshot wound of the chest."

Brooklyn Center police response 

On the morning of April 12, Brooklyn Center police chief Tim Gannon held a press conference and played a clip of the body camera footage. He said Potter intended to use a Taser on Wright, but pulled out and discharged her gun instead. Potter was placed on administrative leave by the Brooklyn Center police pending further investigation.

On April 13, Potter and Gannon submitted their resignations from the Brooklyn Center police department, with Potter's resignation stating it was in the "best interest of the community" and effective immediately. The Brooklyn Center City Council had recommended their firing during an emergency meeting on April 12. According to The Independent, Potter fled her home for safety reasons after her address was leaked on social media.

State and county investigation 
The Minnesota Bureau of Criminal Apprehension (BCA) launched an investigation into the killing of Wright on April 12, per standard procedure, and released Potter's name as the officer who shot Wright. In order to avoid conflicts of interest, although the incident took place in Hennepin County, it was reviewed by the Washington County Attorney's Office per an agreement with metropolitan counties to handle officer-involved shootings. Brooklyn Center Mayor Mike Elliott called on Governor Tim Walz to reassign the case to the office of the State Attorney General Keith Ellison. On April 13, Washington County Attorney Pete Orput said he was planning to complete a "thorough yet expedited" review of potential criminal charges in the case.

Arrest and criminal charges 
On April 14, Potter was charged by the Washington County Attorney's Office with second-degree manslaughter, pursuant to Minnesota Statutes, section 609.205, a felony offense entailing "culpable negligence creating unreasonable risk" that carries a maximum penalty of 10 years incarceration and/or a $20,000 fine. The criminal complaint against Potter stated that she caused Wright's death "by her culpable negligence," whereby she "created an unreasonable risk and consciously took a chance of causing death or great bodily harm" to Wright.

After her indictment, Potter was arrested, booked into a Hennepin County jail and released a few hours later after posting a $100,000 bail bond. Potter briefly made her first court appearance via Zoom on April 15 before Hennepin County Judge Regina Chu. Potter was represented by Earl Gray, a Saint Paul-based attorney who also defended Thomas Lane and Jeronimo Yanez, who were involved with the killings of George Floyd and Philando Castile, respectively.

Attorney General Ellison's office took over the prosecution on May 21. On May 24, Imran Ali, the assistant criminal division chief at the Washington County Attorney's Office, resigned from his job after several activist groups demonstrated outside Orput's home demanding that the charges be raised to murder. Ali's resignation letter cited "vitriol" in public discourse about the case that made his job difficult. Ali had been serving as the prosecution's Washington County co-counsel, with Orput, prior to the state Attorney General's office taking over the case.

On September 2, Ellison's office added the charge of first-degree manslaughter, predicated on reckless use/handling of a firearm, a more serious charge than second-degree manslaughter and carrying a maximum penalty of 15 years in prison and a $30,000 fine.

Protests and unrest 

Following the shooting, mourners and protesters gathered near the scene to demand justice for Wright. Several protesters came from another rally against police violence, organized by families of people who had been killed, earlier in the day in nearby Saint Paul, Minnesota. Officers with riot control equipment arrived, formed, a line, and moved in when demonstrators began climbing on police vehicles and throwing bricks. Police fired tear gas into the crowd and used non-lethal ammunition. There were also reports of looting, damaged property, and vandalized police vehicles. After the crowd moved to outside a police precinct, the police announced that the gathering was an unlawful assembly, and threatened arrest for anyone who did not leave. When the people did not disperse, police fired tear gas, flashbangs, and rubber bullets. Mayor Mike Elliott imposed a curfew until 6 a.m. the next morning and closed schools for the following day. The next day, April 12, protests spread to nearby locations in the Minneapolis-Saint Paul metropolitan area and then to other cities in the United States. Governor Tim Walz implemented another curfew in several counties spanning the night of April 12 through the morning of April 13 and deployed the Minnesota National Guard while Minneapolis Mayor Jacob Frey declared a state of emergency and a citywide curfew.

Protests, civil unrest, curfews, and clashes with police continued for the next several days in Brooklyn Center and around Minneapolis-Saint Paul. Law enforcement in Brooklyn Center established a heavily fortified barrier area and periodically clashed with demonstrators over several days. Air fresheners became a symbol at protests and rallies over Wright's death, referring to one of the violations police alleged Wright committed the day of the shooting. Protesters demanded justice for Wright's death and made several demands of public officials, including a murder charge for Potter, an independent investigation of the shooting, and enactment of police reform measures. In media interviews, Wright's family thanked people for protesting and advocating for justice and encouraged people to protest peacefully.

Protest demonstrations resumed during the trial of Kimberly Potter in late 2021.

Reactions

Public officials 

Brooklyn Center Mayor Mike Elliott said in a tweet the evening of April 11, "The officer shooting in Brooklyn Center today is tragic. We are asking the protesters to continue to be peaceful and that peaceful protesters are not dealt with with force." Elliott said on April 12 that Potter should be fired. Minnesota Governor Tim Walz said in a tweet at 10:00 p.m. on April 11, "I am closely monitoring the situation in Brooklyn Center. Gwen and I are praying for Daunte Wright's family as our state mourns another life of a Black man taken by law enforcement."

Minnesota Lt. Governor Peggy Flanagan said, "As a child advocate, I am grappling with the stark reality: Minnesota is a place where it is not safe to be Black." Senator Tina Smith of Minnesota said on the morning of April 12, "A difficult night in Minnesota. We mourn with Daunte Wright's family as another Black man's life is lost at the hands of law enforcement."

Brooklyn Center Police Chief Tim Gannon said at an April 12 press conference, "I have watched the video myself, and there is nothing I can say to lessen the pain of Mr. Wright's family, friends loved ones of that feeling of loss they must have. That pain is shared by the community and all those involved in the incident." On April 13, Gannon announced his resignation, alongside that of Potter.

City manager Curt Boganey, speaking at an April 12 press conference of Brooklyn Center officials, said, "All employees working for the city of Brooklyn Center are entitled to due process with respect to discipline." The same day, the Brooklyn Center City Council fired Boganey and gave Mayor Elliott command authority over the city police force

President Joe Biden said about the incident and unrest, "Peaceful protest is understandable. And the fact is that we do know that the anger, pain and trauma that exists in Black community in that environment is real – it's serious, and it's consequential. But that does not justify violence. We should listen to Daunte's mom who is calling for peace and calm." Vice President Kamala Harris said "Daunte's family ... needs answers" on Twitter.

Public figures and institutions 

The NAACP released a statement saying "Whether it be carelessness and negligence, or a blatant modern-day lynching, the result is the same. Another Black man has died at the hands of police." Referring to controversy surrounding traffic stops due to small objects dangling from rear-view mirrors, the American Civil Liberties Union said it had "deep concerns that police here appear to have used dangling air fresheners as an excuse for making a pretextual stop, something police do all too often to target Black people."

Former President Barack Obama said of the incident, "Our hearts are heavy over yet another shooting of a Black man, Daunte Wright, at the hands of police. It's important to conduct a full and transparent investigation, but this is also a reminder of just how badly we need to reimagine policing and public safety in this country."

Archbishop Bernard Hebda of the Catholic Archdiocese of Saint Paul and Minneapolis offered prayers and condolences to all parties concerned, adding: "While early indications point towards the shooting being accidental, I encourage allowing investigators from the [BCA] to complete a thorough investigation before coming to any personal judgments as to what occurred."

Al Sharpton said: "You can die for having expired tags or for a phony 20 dollar bill or you may have not even known it was a phony 20 dollar bill. It wouldn't happen in any other community."

Although earlier in the day the Minnesota Twins had issued a statement postponing their Target Field home game, after the announcement of the curfew, the Wild postponed their home game in Saint Paul's Xcel Energy Center and the Timberwolves postponed their game in the Minneapolis Target Center. The Minnesota Vikings released a statement which said in part: "This avoidable situation is yet another tragic reminder of the drastic need for change in law enforcement." At their game back on April 13, the Timberwolves and the visiting Brooklyn Nets observed a moment of silence for Daunte Wright before the game while most players wore shirts that read "With Liberty and Justice FOR ALL".

Chuck Valleau, head of the Brooklyn Center police union, said, "The death of Daunte Wright is terrible. And the loss of our co-worker Kimberly Potter is also terrible for what she's going through as well."

Family 

Soon after the incident, Wright's mother spoke with reporters and said her son had phoned her during the traffic stop. She said she had overheard what sounded like a scuffle and an officer saying, "Daunte, don't run" before the phone hung up, and that her son said he had been pulled over for having an air freshener hanging from his rear-view mirror.

Wright's mother talked about seeing her son's body over FaceTime at a press conference on April 13. The girlfriend of George Floyd was also one of Wright's former teachers, and attended the press conference for support. Floyd had been murdered during an arrest by Derek Chauvin of the Minneapolis police department on May 25, 2020. Relatives of at least six black men killed by the police and a family member of Emmett Till, who had been lynched in Money, Mississippi, in 1955, were also present.

Earlier that day, both parents appeared on Good Morning America, his father saying: "I lost my son, he's never coming back ... I can't accept that—a mistake, that doesn't even sound right," he added. "This officer has been on the force for 26 years. I can't accept that." The mother of Wright's son said: "His dad won't get to see him for his second birthday or for any of his birthdays. And I'm just so messed up about it because I feel like they stole my son's dad from him."

Memorials and funeral 
The evening of April 11, 2021, mourners and protesters held an evening vigil for Wright near the Brooklyn Center location were he was killed. On April 14, 2021, protesters put up a large, wooden sculpture of a raised fist at the 63rd Avenue North and Kathrene Drive intersection where car driven by Wright collided with another vehicle. The sculpture had been displayed previously at George Floyd Square in Minneapolis, but it was replaced there by a version made of metal. People also placed memorials for Wright at the location he was shot and the location where he was pronounced dead.

Wright's funeral was held in Minneapolis on April 22, 2021. In attendance were relatives of Breonna Taylor, Philando Castile, and Oscar Grantblack Americans who had been killed by police over the past dozen yearsand the family of Emmett Till, a black American who was lynched in 1955. The eulogy was delivered by Al Sharpton. Jazz musician Keyon Harrold played an instrumental piece. Minnesota Governor Tim Walz, U.S. Senator Amy Klobuchar, and U.S. Representative Ilhan Omar attended the service. Walz issued a Minnesota proclamation that declared a moment of silence to coincide with the 12 p.m. start of the funeral.

Trial 
Prosecutors filed the criminal case in Hennepin County District Court on April 14 as the State of Minnesota vs. Kimberly Potter. Prior to the start of the case, on November 2, Judge Chu ruled that defense attorneys will be allowed to introduce evidence of "slip and capture" errors, a kind of human error that occurs in times of high stress. Trial proceedings began on November 30 in Minneapolis, at a Hennepin County Government Center courtroom Chu presiding.

The Minnesota Attorney General's office served as the prosecution with Matthew Frank, an assistant attorney general, as the lead prosecutor. Frank was also the lead prosecutor for the trial of Derek Chauvin. Erin Eldridge, an assistant attorney general who also participated in the Chauvin trial, joined Frank. Amanda Montgomery, Paul Engh and Earl Gray represented Potter. Engh and Gray were part of the legal defense fund supplied by the Minnesota Police and Peace Officers Association.

Courtroom cameras 
Minnesota Statutes required that all parties in a trial to agree to the use of courtroom cameras. At the request of Potter's attorneys, Chu ruled on August 5 that cameras would not to be permitted in the courtroom. On November 9, Chu reversed her earlier ruling to ensure "meaningful access" to the trial, as the courtroom was subject to attendance restrictions to prevent the spread of COVID-19. Chu also said her revised ruling was unrelated to a November 6 demonstration that occurred outside a house that protesters believed was Chu's.

Trial proceedings 

Selection for the trial's twelve jurors and two alternative jurors took place from November 30 to December 3. Nine of the twelve jurors seated were White, similar to the demographics of Hennepin County, one was black and two were Asian, with the jury evenly split between men and women.

Opening statements in the trial began on December 8. Throughout the trial, the prosecution argued that Potter neglected training on use of her Taser and discharged her gun recklessly when she killed Wright. The defense argued that Wright resisted arrest, which contributed to a "slip and capture" error. Expert witnesses for the defense testified that Potter had the legal authority to fire either a gun or Taser. Potter testified in her defense, claiming that she mistook her gun for a Taser and admitting to fatally shooting Wright. She also said that she never observed Wright with a gun and that he was not being violent or making verbal threats during the arrest.

Attorneys gave closing arguments on December 20 and the jury, which was ordered to be sequestered, began deliberations by midday.

Verdict and sentencing

After deliberating for 27 hours over four days, the jury found Potter guilty of first-degree manslaughter and second-degree manslaughter on December 23. Following the verdict, Potter was taken into custody and transferred to the state's Women's Correctional Facility in Shakopee.

Potter's sentencing hearing was held on February 18, 2022. Wright's mother, father, two siblings and the mother of his only child gave victim impact statements prior to Potter's sentencing being read. Wright's mother, Katie, said, "she [Potter] never once said his name. And for that I'll never be able to forgive you," addressing Potter. She continued, "I'll never be able to forgive you for what you've stolen from us." Potter, during her statement prior to the sentencing being read, apologized to Wright's family and to the community of Brooklyn Center, saying Wright "is not more than one thought away from my heart, and I have no right for that, for him to be in my heart."

Potter was sentenced to two years in prison, serving sixteen months with eight months of supervised release. The typical sentence for first-degree manslaughter in Minnesota is more than seven years in prison, with a maximum set at fifteen years. To pursue a longer sentence than what is typical requires the prosecution to demonstrate Blakely factors, or elements of a crime which make it particularly egregious. Despite initially arguing that the case had such factors which would justify a longer sentence, the prosecution stated in court on the day of the sentencing that the typical sentence would be appropriate. In explaining her sentencing decision, Chu said the case was unusual, and that Potter made a "tragic mistake" of thinking that she drew her taser instead of her firearm while in a chaotic situation. Chu expressed that it was "one of the saddest cases I’ve had on my 20 years on the bench".

Potter is scheduled for release from prison on April 24, 2023.

Civil lawsuits

On April 12, 2021, Wright's family hired civil rights attorney Benjamin Crump. They also obtained representation from attorneys Tony Romanucci and Jeff Storms. The City of Brooklyn Center settled the lawsuit on June 21, 2022. The city agreed to pay $3.25 million to Wright's family, the third largest civil rights wrongful death settlement in Minnesota, and the largest outside of Minneapolis. The lawsuit also required the city to make changes to policing policies and improve office training, and to establish a permanent memorial to Wright at the site of a temporary one that emerged in the aftermath of his death. A judge in 2023 resolved a dispute between Wright's family and attorneys over distribution of the settlement money. Wright's son received a majority of the settlement, other family members receive a partial distribution of it, and attorney fees were limited.

Alayna Albrecht-Payton, the passenger in Wright's vehicle during the incident on April 11, 2021, filed a civil lawsuit against the city of Brooklyn Center in mid 2022. Albrecht-Payton had suffered a broken jaw when Wright's vehicle crashed. Her lawsuit said she experienced permanent physical injuries and psychological distress. The city settled the lawsuit with Albrecht-Payton in 2023 for $350,000.

Impact on policing

Taser and handgun confusion 
Wright's death was one of several instances in which a police officer admitted to firing a handgun when intending to draw and discharge a Taser, such as a 2002 shooting in Rochester, Minnesota, the fatal 2009 shooting of Oscar Grant by a Bay Area Rapid Transit officer in Oakland, California, and the deadly 2015 shooting of Eric Harris by a volunteer reserve deputy in Tulsa, Oklahoma.

In 2018, an officer coming to assist a policeman being assaulted during a traffic stop shot and wounded the arrestee in Lawrence, Kansas. After discharging her gun, startled, she yelled, "Oh, shit, I shot him." Though that officer was charged, a judge dismissed the charges. In 2019, a scuffle in a jail cell led to another accidental shooting by a backup officer in New Hope, Pennsylvania. The Bucks County, Pennsylvania District Attorney declined to press charges against the officer, saying state law excused the officer's conduct from criminal prosecution because of his "honest but mistaken" belief he was firing his Taser when he shot the wounded prisoner. In both cases, the officers shouted "Taser" before firing.

Including Potter's killing of Wright, there had been 16 known cases when a police officer in the United States fired a pistol at someone but claimed to have intended to use a Taser instead.

Changes to policies 

The killing of Daunte Wright led to several changes in policing policies in Brooklyn Center and elsewhere. In Brooklyn Center, the city council passed an ordinance in May 2021 named after Daunte Wright and Kobe Dimock-Heisler, another black man who had been killed in an encounter with city police prior to Wright. The ordinance created unarmed traffic enforcement and community response teams, and it prohibited arrests or vehicle searches in certain traffic-related encounters. Wright's family believed that had the policy been in place when he was stopped by police, he would not have been killed. In September 2021, Brooklyn Center officials announced a new policy to cite and release criminal offenders for misdemeanor and gross misdemeanor charges rather than take people into immediate custody. Under the policy, police officers would still be able to make an arrest if an offender posed a safety threat. In December 2021, the city council passed a $1.3 million plan for alternative public safety programs, such as the use of unarmed workers to enforce nonmoving traffic violations and mental health response teams. $303,114 of the programs' budget came from eliminating three police officer positions.

Local officials in Minnesota called for measures to better distinguish Tasers and firearms, as part of comprehensive police reform. In August 2021, Minneapolis, Minnesota, police announced they would not make traffic stops for minor infractions, such as expired vehicle tabs or having objects hanging on mirrors.

Several other policing changes were made outside of the U.S. state of Minnesota in response to Wright's death. The police departments of Roeland Park, Kansas, and St. Ann, Missouri, made changes to their Taser policies, with Roeland Park police saying they would cross draw Tasers with "no exceptions", and St. Ann police saying they would only use yellow Tasers and require officers to carry them opposite their main weapon. The Washington State Legislature passed House Bill 1267, which will create a statewide office to investigate use-of-force incidents by July 2022, and Senate Bill 5259, which will create a statewide database of use-of-force incidents.

A broad public safety and police reform plan put forward by Brooklyn Center Mayor Mike Elliot in the aftermath of Wright's death became a source of political controversy as it ultimately failed to be enacted into law. Elliot was defeated in a re-election bid in the 2022 Minnesota elections by April Graves who largely ran on the issue.

See also 
2020–2022 United States racial unrest
List of killings by law enforcement officers in Minnesota

Notes

References

Further reading 

 2022 Minnesota Statutes, § 609.20 Manslaughter in the First Degree, Retrieved January 23, 2022.
2022 Minnesota Statutes, § 609.205 Manslaughter in the Second Degree, Retrieved January 23, 2022.
 McKinney, Matt and Kim Hyatt (August 22, 2021). "Forced to grieve in the spotlight: Daunte Wright's parents feel public support but also vilification of their son after his shooting death by a police officer in Brooklyn Center". Star Tribune. Retrieved August 22, 2021.

External links 

 Body camera footage posted by KARE-11, via YouTube, Retrieved January 23, 2022.
 Brooklyn Center, Minnesota, official website

2020s in Minneapolis
2021 controversies in the United States
2020–2021 United States racial unrest
African-American history of Minnesota
African-American-related controversies
African Americans shot dead by law enforcement officers in the United States
April 2021 events in the United States
Black Lives Matter
Deaths by firearm in Minnesota
Deaths by person in Minnesota
Filmed killings by law enforcement
Law enforcement in Minnesota